Horny may refer to:
 Horn (anatomy)
 Epimedium, also known as "horny goat weed"
 Hornyhead chub, a North American freshwater fish with a Twitter
 Horned lizard, also known as "horny toad" or "horned frog"
 Horny layer of skin
 Horny, a character in the game The Adventures of Willy Beamish
 The Horned Reaper, a character from the Dungeon Keeper series of video games
 Horny, slang for one feeling sexually aroused

Songs 
 "Horny" (Mark Morrison song), 1996
 "Horny" (OPM song), 2005
 "Horny '98", by Mousse T., 1998
 "Horny", by Pussy Riot from Matriarchy Now

People with this name 
 Franz Horny, German painter
 Štefan Horný, Slovak football manager

See also 

Horney, a surname